Richwood may refer to:

Places
United States
 Richwood, Georgia
 Richwood, Kentucky
 Richwood, Louisiana
 Richwood Township, Minnesota
 Richwood, New Jersey
 Richwood, Ohio
 Richwood, Texas
 Richwood, West Virginia
 Richwood, Wisconsin, a town
 Richwood, Dodge County, Wisconsin, an unincorporated community

Elsewhere
 Richwood, Cape Town, South Africa

Other uses
 Richwood Guitars, a European guitar manufacturer

See also
 Richwoods (disambiguation)